Big numbers may refer to:

 Large numbers, numbers that are significantly larger than those ordinarily used in everyday life
 Arbitrary-precision arithmetic, also called bignum arithmetic
 Big Numbers (comics), an unfinished comics series by Alan Moore and Bill Sienkiewicz

See also
 Names of large numbers
 List of arbitrary-precision arithmetic software